Philippe Blanchard (born January 1942) has been a Professor of Mathematical Physics at Faculty of Physics, Bielefeld University since 1980. He is both director of the Research Center BiBoS (Bielefeld-Bonn Stochastics) and deputy managing director of the Center for Interdisciplinary Research (Zentrum für interdisziplinäre Forschung, ZiF) at Bielefeld University.

Academia
Blanchard is also the editor of Progress in Mathematical Physics, Mathematical Physics, Analysis and Geometry, and Fundamental Theories of Physics.

Among his 240 scientific publications are books such as Mathematical and Physical Aspects of Stochastic Mechanics (with P. Combe & W. Zheng, 1987), Mathematical Methods in Physics: Distributions, Hilbert Space Operators and Variational Methods (with E. Brüning, 2002), and Mathematical Analysis of Urban Spatial Networks (with D. Volchenkov, 2008).

Blanchard's fields of interest comprise the application of functional analysis and probability theory (stochastic analysis, random graphs), quantum and statistical physics (percolation theory, self-organized criticality), epidemiology (disease spreading), and sociology (learning as a social process, social contagion).

Research
NEMO – Network Models, Governance and R&D collaboration networks (EU, 2006–2009)
Network formation rules, random set graphs and generalized epidemic processes (Volkswagen Foundation, 2006–2009);
From basic concepts and methods on the structure and function of complex networks to modeling of concrete real-world networks (Volkswagen Foundation, 2004–2006)

Selected publications

Sources
University Bio

External links
Research Center BiBoS

1945 births
Academic staff of Bielefeld University
20th-century German physicists
Living people
Mathematical physicists
21st-century German physicists